Harriet the Spy is an American animated television series for Apple TV+, loosely based on the book of the same name by Louise Fitzhugh. The series premiered on November 19, 2021. Season 2 will premiere on May 5, 2023.

Cast and characters
Beanie Feldstein as Harriet M. Welsch
Jane Lynch as Catherine Myrtle "Willa" Galliano ("Ole Golly")
Lacey Chabert as Marion Hawthorne
Kimberly Brooks as Janie Gibbs, Mrs. Gibbs (Janie's mom)
Crispin Freeman as Mr. Welsch (Harriet's dad)
Grey Griffin as Mrs. Welsch (Harriet's mom)
Bumper Robinson as Mr. Gibbs (Janie's dad)
Charlie Schlatter as Simon "Sport" Rocque

Production
In August 2020, it was announced that Apple TV+ had given a series order to an animated television adaptation of the novel Harriet the Spy. The series is produced by The Jim Henson Company and Rehab Entertainment with Will McRobb as writer, Sidney Clifton as producer and Terissa Kelton and John W. Hyde as executive producer. It would star Beanie Feldstein as Harriet, Jane Lynch as Ole Golly, and Lacey Chabert as Marion Hawthorne. A trailer was released on October 12, 2021. 5 episodes aired on November 19, 2021, and 5 more aired on May 20, 2022. On January 25, 2023, it was announced season 2 will be released on May 5, 2023.

Episodes

Season 1 (2021-2022)

Reception 

The series received a mixed reception. Ashley Moulton of Common Sense Media described the series as a "so-so TV adaptation of classic kid sleuth story." She also said that Harriet "was never meant to be a role model" but has some qualities which are admirable and pointed to a "fair amount of consumerism", arguing that the "charm of the book" doesn't quite translate to the series, and that those into "sleuth stories" should read the original instead.

References

External links
 Harriet the Spy at Apple TV
 Harriet the Spy at IMDb

2020s American animated television series
2021 American television series debuts
American children's animated adventure television series
American children's animated comedy television series
Apple TV+ original programming
English-language television shows
Television series by The Jim Henson Company
Animated television series about children
Animated series based on novels
Television shows based on American novels
Television series set in the 1960s
Television series set in 1964
Television shows set in New York City
Apple TV+ children's programming